Luis Morales, O.S.A. (1608 – 10 January 1681) was a Roman Catholic prelate who served as Bishop of Tropea (1667–1681) 
and Bishop of Ariano (1659–1667).

Biography
Luis Morales was born in Lucerna, Spain in 1608 and ordained a priest in the Order of Saint Augustine.
On 10 March 1659, he was appointed during the papacy of Pope Alexander VII as Bishop of Ariano.
On 16 March 1659, he was consecrated bishop by Marcantonio Franciotti, Cardinal-Priest of Santa Maria della Pace.<ref name
On 7 February 1667, he was appointed during the papacy of Pope Alexander VII as Bishop of Tropea.
He served as Bishop of Tropea until his death on 10 January 1681.

References

External links and additional sources
 (for Chronology of Bishops) 
 (for Chronology of Bishops) 
 (for Chronology of Bishops) 
 (for Chronology of Bishops) 

17th-century Italian Roman Catholic bishops
Bishops appointed by Pope Alexander VII
Bishops of Ariano
1608 births
1681 deaths
Augustinian bishops